The 1996 Preston Borough Council election for the Preston Borough Council Elections was held in May 1996. One third of the council was up for election.

Ashton

Avenham

Brookfield

Cadley

Central

Deepdale

Fishwick

Greyfriars

Ingol

Larches

Moor Park

Preston Rural East

Preston Rural West

Ribbleton

Riversway

Sharoe Green

Sherwood

St Matthews

Tulketh

References

1996 English local elections
1996
1990s in Lancashire